Orleans Parish Prison is the city jail for New Orleans, Louisiana.  First opened in 1837, it is operated by the Orleans Parish Sheriff's Office. Most of the prisoners—1,300 of the 1,500 or so as of June 2016—are awaiting trial.

In May 2013, Orleans Parish Prison ranked as one of the ten worst prisons in the United States, based on reporting in Mother Jones magazine.

History
The old Parish Prison opened in 1837 on the square bound by Orleans, Tremé, St. Ann, and Marais. During the day, prisoners were kept outside in the segregated courtyards. At night, most prisoners slept on the floor of crowded cells with only two blankets each. The last prisoners left in 1895. The location was later used to construct a building for the Sewerage and Water Board. In 1895, The Times-Picayune described Orleans Parish Prison as:

The prison closed in early 1895 and in 1931, prison and court functions were relocated to new facilities at Tulane and Broad, over one mile straight back on Tulane Avenue. In 1967, the House of Detention complex opened, followed by Community Corrections Center (CCC) complex in 1976. HOD closed in 2012 and CCC has since been abandoned since 2005.

Safety and conditions
The Orleans Parish Prison has had tremendous problems for a long time. Most problems caused by lack of mentoring of the inmates by deputies. Several fights, stabbings and deaths had occurred in the prison mostly in the 13-story high-rise House of Detention which has become infamous.   
A group of inmates filed a class-action lawsuit against the jail in 1969 but problems still went unaddressed. Statistics researchers considered Orleans Parish Prison to probably be the worst jail in the country. The prison was described as too large, understaffed, and filthy. Prisoners lived in fear of being beaten or raped. In 2012 there were 600 ambulance runs to the emergency room, with far more than half of them related to violence. Guards rarely patrolled the House of Detention, one of several buildings comprising the Orleans Parish Prison complex. Prisoners had access to drugs and weapons such as kitchen knives and handguns by way of guards.

Abandonment during Hurricane Katrina 
On August 29, 2005, when Hurricane Katrina–an extremely destructive and deadly category 5 hurricane–struck the Gulf Coast, the staff of Orleans Parish Sheriff's Office abandoned the jail leaving roughly 650 prisoners in their cells with no access to food, water, or ventilation for days. Deputies returned to the Orleans Parish Prison days later and began evacuating inmates to surrounding areas which included the Elayn Hunt Correctional Center, the I-10 overpass, and the Broad Street overpass.

In over 400 testimonials conducted by the American Civil Liberties Union, prisoners described their experiences during the abandonment which included exposure to floodwater and other elements, hunger, beatings by jail staff and other inmates, and other racially-charged abuse by jail staff. While there is no official death count for prisoners that were left behind, 517 prisoners were later registered as "unaccounted for" by Humans Rights Watch.

Refurbishment
The Federal Emergency Management Agency dedicated $223 million to the Orleans Parish Sheriff's Office for restoration of its facilities following Hurricane Katrina in 2005. The Sheriff's Office has outlined three phases of construction that would utilize these funds.

Phase I
The Phase I facility is a three-story,  building consisting of a kitchen and warehouse.

Phase II
Opened in 2015, Phase II contains 1,438 beds and cost $145 million to construct.

Phase III
The Sheriff’s Office plans to build an additional 750-bed facility. The Orleans Parish Prison Reform Coalition opposes the plan, calling on former Democratic Mayor Mitch Landrieu's office to "oppose any options involving the expansion of the jail," and instead support "retrofitting of the current jail to better care for incarcerated special populations."

Inmate deaths in later years
Between April 2006 and April 2014, The Times-Picayune reports 44 inmate deaths, including seven "uncounted" deaths, referring to inmates released shortly before their deaths. Since the report, there have been five additional fatalities, bringing the total to 49 since April 2006.

Notable inmates
The 10 to 12 adult women onboard the Golden Venture vessel from China that washed ashore in the Rockaways in New York City in June 1993 were kept at Orleans Parish Prison for a few years.

On November 29, 2015, state Senator Troy E. Brown of Ascension Parish was booked in the Orleans Parish Prison for domestic abuse battery, a misdemeanor stemming from an incident with his alleged long-term paramour, a woman from Labadieville, at the Hyatt Regency Hotel near the Caesars Superdome in New Orleans.

References

External links
 Orleans Parish Sheriff’s Office
 Orleans Parish Prison Reform Coalition
 Vera Institute of Justice: New Orleans Center

Buildings and structures in New Orleans
Parish jails in Louisiana
Government buildings completed in 2015